Ubakala is a large town in Umuahia South Local Government Area (LGA) of Abia State, Nigeria. It is one of the major ancient clans of Umuahia. A popular market for which it is known is the Apumiri Market. Umuahia South Local Government Area Headquarters is located at Apumiri as well. Ubakala is situated southwards of 
Umuahia main township. Its well defined boundaries   geographically places it at the North of Ntigha (a community in Isiala-Ngwa LGA).

History

There is the popular belief that Ubakala didn't migrate from anywhere in the distant past. Legend however has it that a wealthy merchant called Uba (or Ubaka according to other oral sources) founded what we know today as Ubakala. It was said that during the mass exodus of the Igbo, he sojourned with his family, goods and servants across undulating hills and valleys towards the Imo river, he discovered a lush rainforest inhabited only by wild beasts and large trees. As he surveyed the entire virgin territory, he finally exclaimed to himself "Uba ikala!" (that is to say, "Uba you have increased!"), thus, coining a name for his newfound domain - Ubakala.

It was also said that he placed his sons in three strategic areas of the land namely - Mba-iyi, Ala-ocha and Nsuda-Imo. His sons helped manage his wealth in these three areas and gave rise to children who over time married and had their own offspring, which over generations evolved into villages.

Cuisine

Traditional cuisine typically involves Akpu (fufu)/Pounded yam (Asurasu Ji)  and Okazi soup cooked with achara and akpụrụakpụ elile. Other soups popular in Ubakala are the ụgbọghọrọ soup, bitter-leaf soup, Oha soup, elile soup and the Ugu soup.

Delicacies consumed in other parts of Igboland as well as Ibibio-efik communities are consumed in Ubakala too.

Religion

In ancient times, Ubakala people were Animists whose cultural and religious practices bore interesting similarities to Judaism as seen also in every other Igbo community. Ubakala people also adhered to the long juju (Ibini Ukpabi) shrine in Arochukwu as well as lesser deities like the Njoku Ji. The Ekpe secret society (Okonko) was quite prominent during those times. A masquerade festival called "Abu Nkwu" took place on occasional basis. Ubakala believed in reincarnation and ancestor honor as part of their worldview.

Today, Ubakala people are predominantly Protestant Christians. Denominations like Anglicanism, Presbyterianism, Adventist Movements, Qua Iboe Churches, Assemblies of God Churches amongst others are conspicuous. Catholicism has some degree of foothold in Ubakala as well.

Social structure

Ubakala people are generally modest, religious, and industrious. Their dance-plays are well documented in contemporary  anthropology and the Oxford's International Encyclopedia of Dance. Ubakala is a patrilineal, egalitarian and achievement oriented clan. Once led by  constitutional monarchs who bore the now defunct 'Uba of Ubakala' title, Ubakala has evolved into conglomerates of thirteen viable villages, each one presided over by an instituted Eze with his council of elders/chiefs.

The 13 villages of Ubakala which now have the status of Autonomous Communities are:
 Nsukwe
 Amibo
 Umuogo
 Amuzu
 Eziama
 Mgbarakuma
 Umuosu
 Avodim
 Laguru
 Abam
 Nsirimo
 Ipupe
 Umuako

References

Populated places in Abia State